The streber (Zingel streber), also known as the Danube streber, is a species of freshwater ray-finned fish in the family Percidae. It is found in strongly flowing waters in the Danube and Dniester drainages of Austria, Bosnia and Herzegovina, Bulgaria, Croatia, the Czech Republic, Germany, Greece, Hungary, Italy, Moldova, Serbia, Slovakia, Slovenia, Switzerland, and Ukraine.

Sources

Bibliography

Zingel
Freshwater fish of Europe
Fish described in 1863
Taxa named by Karl Theodor Ernst von Siebold
Taxonomy articles created by Polbot